Pearlie is an animated comedy series based on the children's book series Pearlie the Park Fairy by Wendy Harmer. Pearlie is a co-production between Australian children's television producer Sticky Pictures and Canadian animation house Nelvana Limited. The series aired on Network Ten in Australia, YTV in Canada, Pop Girl in the United Kingdom, and Qubo in the United States. 26 episodes were produced.

Synopsis
Pearlie is a park fairy appointed by Fairy Headquarters to keep Jubilee Park in order. She is full of over-the-top plans for parties and events for the park and its residents, and as she puts it, "everything has to be perfect" for whatever it is she's planning.  She is assisted by Jasper, an elf who prefers to not do any real work. There is also Opal, an outback fairy from Australia sent to learn the ropes of park management from Pearlie.

Pearlie's cousin Saphira is jealous of Pearlie's popularity in the fairy world and desperately wants her to be fired. With her assistant Ludwig, a common bat, Saphira sets out to spoil perky Pearlie's day any way she can. Pearlie remains oblivious, always thinking the best of her cousin, while Opal and Jasper are aware of Saphira's plans.

Characters

Fairies

Pearlie
Appointed by Fairy Headquarters, Pearlie is a park fairy who keeps Jubilee Park in sparkling order. Her eyes are green, she has freckles, and her hair is light blonde with light turquoise highlights.

She is the titular protagonist of the series and she appears in all episodes. Pearlie is a do-gooder with a lot of compassion, kindness with a bubbly personality that is well liked amongst the inhabitants of Jubilee Park. She knows the Fairy Rules and follows them while warning others of "big persons" (humans) as fairies and elves cannot and shouldn't be seen by humans.

Pearlie is well meaning and has fun but of over-the-top plans and parties for the park and its residents and sometimes doesn't listen to her clients needs. Once she does slow down and listen, Pearlie sincerely apologizes changes the plans happily. Some of Pearlie's catchphrases are "stars and moonbeams", "hurley burley", "roots and twigs", and "buds and blossoms!"

She also loves singing and dancing and she always wears a pearly tiara with two colors; causally blue and pink during fancy events. Pearlie has no idea of her cousin's evil plans, always thinking the best of her. She has a crush on an autumn fairy named Leaf, and he likes her as well which is shown in the series. 
Pearlie's magic wand has a snowflake made of pearls on the tip (hence, the pearl is her namesake).

Opal
Opal is an Australian Outback fairy sent to North America (possibly somewhere in Canada) by the Fairy Council to learn Advanced Potion Making. Opal does not use a wand, instead she has a magic lasso. Opal lives in a hollow log at the edge of the desert garden within the park. A bit of a tomboy, Opal loves to dance, boots are her favorite footwear and she is also a bug rodeo champion.

Opal knows that Saphira is mean and has a very conceited attitude which shows that she  is always up to no good. Opal makes it known that she dislikes Saphira and does her best to defend anyone from Saphira's wrath. Opal can be impatient but she has a big heart who is always there to help her friends and other animals. Opal sometimes gets really irritated at Pearlie who at times gets in over her head when it comes to getting tasks done. Every now and then Opal doesn't think before she does something, but she admits her mistakes and works on them. She loves bugs and reptiles as they are indigenous to Australia. Opal owns a pet frilled lizard called Ned.

Saphira
Her name is commonly misspelled because of how it is said on the show - even though the books clearly writes her name as Sapphire. She is Pearlie's vain, lazy, evil cousin and the main antagonist of the series. She calls herself the Queen of Darkness, as all she wears is sapphire blue and thinks she can overrule everyone else. Sapphire has been thwarted many times.

She lives in the Jubilee Park greenhouse within Jubilee Park and runs it as a successful, well maintained and gorgeous exclusive spa. Sapphire is jealous of her cousin's cheerful disposition, being on top of things who is well-liked, and wants Pearlie fired. Sapphire spends her days plotting new and dastardly ways to sabotage Pearlie at every turn who is totally oblivious to her cousin's motives, but they often lead to Sapphire's own undoing. On very rare occasions, she helps Pearlie and her friends.

Saphira has two ready and willing assistants to do her bidding: one is Ludwig who is a common bat, and the park's Fairy HQ representative goblin Gobsmack, who will do anything for her. She often berates Lüdwig ("shut up, you [ignorant twit]!") and often acts rude towards Gobsmack who doesn't notice or care because of his infatuation for her.

In one episode, Saphira fires Lüdwig and they temporarily become happy to be away from each other. However, when Pearlie checks on Sapphire, her hair and clothes are in a disarray, she starts bumbling, and the greenhouse spa and her room become extremely messy and utterly disorganized, while Lũdwig grows bored and starts missing Sapphire. Pearlie, Jasper, and Opal do their best to get Saphira to rehire Lüdwig.

Aside from her insults towards Lüdwig, some of her catchphrases are "stop fooling around with me!" and "I'll trick them for sure!". She is named after the sapphire gemstone.

Fern
Fern is a wood nymph, with red/orange hair, who is Jasper's crush in the series. She also shares Jasper's love for nature, having a fascination in particular with birds. She is kind, open minded with zen-like patience, looks and acts a lot like a 1960s hippie and talks to animals in a chant, saying 'Love, Peace, Trees,' although she only actually does this in 'Trick In the Stick.' She appears in three episodes; 'Trick in the Stick', 'The Fern Turns' and 'Come Fly With Me.' Her wand is a twig.

Great Aunt Garnet
Pearlie's well-meaning but absent minded great aunt. Garnet runs a store packed full of potions and lotions that always work, just not like they are supposed to. The store is inside a clock tower across the road from the park. Garnet is wise and patient who teaches Pearlie and Opal about potions. She used to be a Fairy Godmother until she retired.

Laverne
Laverne is a fairy dressed in pink and green with green wings on her back. She is a seasonal fairy in charge of Spring and her magic wand is spring-themed. She appears in some episodes and in one of them, inside Sapphire's spa, Laverne and Noel fight each other by using magic which angers Saphira. She is also shown to have a bit of a hot temper in one episode. As revealed in "The Big Sneeze", she also has a megaphone that looks like a flower.

Oriana
Oriana is a plus sized and sweet summer fairy. She wears a skirted bathing suit and carries summer things. In the beginning of one of the episodes she prepares to leave Jubilee Park because summer is over and fall is about to begin.

Leif
Leif is an autumn fairy has a crush on Pearlie who likes him back. Saphira has a crush on Leif too, though he does not like her back at all for her negative and snide attitude. Leif's hobby is playing the violin which he is very good at. He is also the new fairy of Fall (his uncle Harvey was the Fall fairy before him).

Noel
Noel is the winter fairy with a white mustache. He wears winter clothes that are mostly blue.

Coral
Coral is Pearlie's mother and Saphira's aunt. She is Agate's younger sister. Coral is exactly like Pearlie: fun, sweet, thoughtful, kind but much more mature than her daughter which is to be expected because she is an older fairy with much life experience. Coral is soft-spoken and not as outspoken and brash in a good way as her elder sister Agate. Coral only appears in "Mother Magic" alongside Agate.

Agate
Agate is Pearlie's aunt, Saphira's mother and Coral's big sister. She is best friends with her younger sister Coral. Agate loves her daughter Sapphire immensely but will not take any back sass or rudeness from her at all. She only appears in "Mother Magic".

Twinkle-Twinkle
Twinkle-Twinkle is a vain fairy who is the best singing superstar in Jubilee Park. She does sing her songs. She sings, having a tape play the voice she once had. How she lost her voice is unknown. In one of the episodes, she has been tricked by Sapphire whose plan was to make her voice sound terrible, (Opal helped, since it would benefit Pearlie, who's been bossed around by Twinkle-Twinkle throughout the episode). It was the only plan that ever worked for Saphira. Pearlie unknowingly helps by pulling the plug on Twinkle-Twinkle's tape player.

Astrid
Astrid is a fairy with blue eyes and black hair. She works as the head of dream department wearing a black suit and skirt and carrying a red toolbox and an orange-redess ladybug phone. Her design is based on Pearlie creator Wendy Harmer.

The Turquoise Fairy
She is a famous fairy author, of very few, but stern words. The Turquoise Fairy has turquoise eyes, hair and dress that match.

She is first seen stopping Saphira's magic wand that shone a bright light that exposed Jasper who was hiding. He became human size from using fairy magic when he wasn't supposed to. The Turquoise Fairy's powerful wand changed Jasper back to his normal elf size albeit a little smaller.

The Turquoise Fairy then casts a spell on Saphira's nose that's exactly to that of Pinocchio for sabotaging Pearlie and Opal's efforts to get him back to normal elf size.

Jingle
Jingle is a Christmas fairy and is shown to be the smallest of the fairies. She is based on the Christmas Angel in the book series, made obvious when she flies to the top of the Christmas tree and poses as an angel.
She only appears in the Christmas episode.

The Fairy Queen
This fairy is inspired by Queen Elizabeth I. Her first name is Emerald.

Finn
Finn is a tooth fairy that Pearlie and Saphira fall in love with. He appears in at least two episodes.

Prime Minister Puckle
The head of the Grand Fairy Federation, He is also very fond of taffy, "Prime Minister wants taffy". This character is a parody of Kevin Rudd.

Elves
In this show, elves have bees' wings and they can also fly like fairies.

Jasper
Jasper is a garden elf with dreadlocks who likes to go barefoot (while happily declaring himself "a barefoot toe wiggling elf"  and can talk to plants. He is bit lazy and is Pearlie's best friend. Although being an elf, he has wings. Because of this he is often mistaken for a fairy, much to his annoyance.  He has a crush on Fern and loves nature. His job is to keep the plants and animals in the park happy by doing random activities with them. Jasper lives in an abandoned mailbox at the park gates. Jasper is always trying to get Pearlie to stop her work and smell the roses. Jasper has been seen with Pearlie in almost every episode.

Sterling
Sterling is a black-haired elf who is initially nice, but later on a sneaky criminal. He tricks Saphira and Lüdwig into going out of her place. He steals a magic spell-binding orb, only being seen twice and he has a fear of spiders.

Bats

Lüdwig
Lüdwig is Saphira's servant bat and sidekick. He cannot live without Saphira and vice versa. He puts up with her tough love as he is infatuated with her. Lüdwig has a twin bat brother Johann who lives in the wild (and despite being as German as Lüdwig, though with stereotypical German mispronunciations such as pronouncing /w/ as [v]. His name is also not said with an anglicized pronunciation, and instead with the original German phonetics, "LOOD-vik"), but Lüdwig prefers being a house-bat, waiting on Sapphire claw and wing. He sleeps in a broom closet. Ludwig also displays an unusual humorous intellect, (e.g. saying "sublimely devious.")

Johann
Johann is Lüdwig's twin brother and he wants Lüdwig to have the freedom that he wants.

Others

Gobsmack
Gobsmack is the Regional Elf Inspector and the representative of the headquarters in Jubilee Park. Panicky Gobsmack is a stickler for the rules, the first to blab if Pearlie's making a mess of things. Being not a fairy but a goblin, Gobsmack doesn't fly and instead has the power of teleportation. He ‘pops’ in at the worst possible moments for Pearlie. Gobsmack is easily manipulated by Sapphire. He's always lured in by a free facial or knee buffing in her spa. He enjoys country music. His catchphrase is "Cheese and peanuts!" Gobsmack is also very effeminate, however has a crush on Sapphire and helps her to make Pearlie look bad so she can lose her position.

Gadzook
Gobsmack's boss and head goblin. He fires Gobsmack in one episode because he thought Pearlie had everything in the park under control and Gobsmack was not needed. Gobsmack later gets his job back after Gadzook sees him tell Saphira the rules she broke for unauthorized renovations on her greenhouse.

Moe
Moe is a pixie with a black mustache and beard. His aliases are Monsieur Snip and Manuel. He is a criminal wanted for cutting the heads off flowers. Saphira once made a plan for Mo to cut off all of Pearlie's hair, but it does not go according to plan (he tries to cut off Jasper's hair instead, to give himself a wig). He only appears in two episodes.

Norville
Norville is a gnome that once filled in for Jasper while he was on a job swap. He appears in the episode "No Place Like Gnome".

Sugar
Sugar is a possum who plays the Bongo drums with Jasper and other possums. And she wonders if Jasper is ever wearing sandals or not. She married Brush in "Possumbillities".

Scrag and Mr. Flea
Scrag and Mr. Flea are "gangsta" rats who spend their days rooting in park garbage for treats. Though a pair of dirty and smelly nuisances, they are respectful towards Pearlie. But in one episode they make their kingdom, "Ratopia", and even drive Saphira to help Pearlie.

Ned
Ned is Opal's pet from the outback, he is an orange frilled neck lizard. Lüdwig thought he was a dragon. In the series, he has only had two appearances.

The Ants
This colony of ants has food to carry and different voices and they have a queen of their own. Her name is Ida. The female worker ant has eyelashes.

The Butterflies
This group of characters are colorful and completely feminine.  One of the butterflies is named Heather, another is named Iffy and another Sgwiffy.

The Fleas
These characters are a family of opera - singing fleas who live in the rats named Scrag and Mr. Flea. The father flea Plácido is named after the famous tenor Plácido Domingo and the mother flea Carmen is named after the title character in the opera.

The Ladybugs
These characters have womanly hairdos due to their femininity. They also have their babies in "Mother Magic".

The Moths
These characters are almost brown and completely masculine. One of the moths is named Malcolm. Malcolm is Lüdwig's best friend. They play checkers at night together. Pearlie is the only one that knows of their friendship due to the fact that bats usually eat moths, but Lüdwig does not.
Malcolm also appears to have a crush on Heather (a butterfly) in one episode.

The Flowers
These characters are that Pearlie uses a potion so she can talk to them and persuade them to look good for a photo shoot, but they're argumentative towards Pearlie.

Nancy
A centipede with a red body and a black Asian updo on her head. She works as Sapphire's massager.

Splish
Splish is a water sprite and Pearlie's neighbor for a week. She lives at the beach. She only appears in one episode.

Whizzer
Whizzer is a dragonfly who delivers objects around Jubilee Park for Great Aunt Garnet. He wears a mailman's hat.

Crash
A very tough teal-colored fat dragonfly with a pink heart in an arrow tattoo on his arm. His name comes from the fact that he has been involved in many dangerous crashes.

Buggy Holly and the Crickets
A famous rock band who comes to Jubilee Park to put on a rock concert. They are seen in the episode "Bongo Boy" performing in Jubilee Park at a rock concert. He is the lead singer for his band. But then, if the drummer can't perform, they may have to cancel the concert. However, when the regular drummer returns, Jasper is out of the band. They are based on Buddy Holly and the Crickets.

Voice cast
 Marieve Herington - Pearlie
 Hélène Joy - Opal
 Nathan Stephenson - Jasper
 Michelle Monteith - Saphira
 Jonathan Wilson - Lüdwig
 Fiona Reid - Great Aunt Garnet
 David Berni - Gobsmack
 Christian Potenza - Scrag
 Neil Crone - Mr. Flea
 Stacey DePass - Fern

Episodes

Home media 
Australian media distributor Madman Entertainment released five DVDs of Pearlie in 2010.

References

External links

 Official Site
 Pearlie on Madman Entertainment

YTV (Canadian TV channel) original programming
Network 10 original programming
Australian children's animated comedy television series
Australian children's animated fantasy television series
Canadian children's animated comedy television series
Canadian children's animated fantasy television series
2009 Australian television series debuts
2011 Australian television series endings
2000s Australian animated television series
2010s Australian animated television series
2000s Canadian animated television series
2010s Canadian animated television series
2009 Canadian television series debuts
2011 Canadian television series endings
English-language television shows
Television about fairies and sprites
Television shows set in New York City
Television series by Nelvana
NBC original programming
Australian television shows based on children's books
Canadian television shows based on children's books
Canadian flash animated television series
Qubo